WEQF-FM is a Religious formatted broadcast radio station licensed to Dillwyn, Virginia, serving Buckingham County, Virginia.  WEQF-FM is owned and operated by Calvary Chapel of Lynchburg.

References

External links
 EquipFM Online
 

2000 establishments in Virginia
Radio stations established in 2000
EQF-FM
Buckingham County, Virginia
Calvary Chapel Association